Uncle Silas (German: Onkel Silas) is a West German period television drama series which first aired on ARD in 1977. It is an adaptation of the novel of the same title by Sheridan Le Fanu.

Cast
 Hannes Messemer as Onkel Silas
 Cornelia Köndgen as Maud
 Gerlinde Döberl as  Milly
 Giovanni Früh as Dudley
 Dagmar Altrichter as  Lady Nollys
 Ellen Schwiers as Madame Rougierre
 Rainer Rudolph as  Captain Oakley
 Hans Jaray as  Anwalt Brenton
 Alfons Höckmann as Anwalt Sleight
 Wolfgang Unterzaucher as  Pfarrer Bowland
 Stephan Schwartz as Tom
 Johannes Buzalski as Torfstecher Hawkes
 Katerina Jacob as Meg Hawkes
 Elisabeth Endriss as Sarah

References

Bibliography
 Knut Hickethier. Das Fernsehspiel der Bundesrepublik: Themen, Form, Struktur, Theorie und Geschichte ; 1951-1977. Metzler, 1980.

External links
 

1977 films
1977 television films
German television films
1977 German television series debuts
1977 German television series endings
1970s drama television series
German-language television shows
Television shows based on Irish novels
Films based on Irish novels
Films based on works by Sheridan Le Fanu
Das Erste original programming